In multilinear algebra, mode-m flattening
 
Matrixizing may be regarded as a generalization of the mathematical concept of vectorization.
 

Defintion (Mode-m Flattening or Mode-m Matrixizing):

The mode-m matrixizing of tensor  is defined as the matrix
. As the parenthetical ordering indicates, the mode-m column vectors are arranged by
sweeping all the other mode indices through their ranges,
with smaller mode indexes varying more rapidly than larger
ones; thus

, where  and 

By comparison, the matrix  that results from an unfolding has columns that are the result of sweeping through all the modes in a circular manner beginning with mode m+1 as seen in the paranthetical ordering.  This is an inefficient way to matrixize.

Applications

This operation is used widely in tensor algebra and its methods, such as Parafac and HOSVD.

References 

Algebra
Multilinear algebra